Pavla Tomicová (born 25 June 1962) is a Czech actress. Tomicová has acted in various films, including Boredom in Brno, Rafťáci and Hrubeš a Mareš jsou kamarádi do deště.

References

External links

1962 births
Living people
People from Karviná
Czech television actresses
Czech film actresses
Czech stage actresses
20th-century Czech actresses
21st-century Czech actresses
Academy of Performing Arts in Prague alumni